2OG may be an abbreviation for the following:

2-Oleoylglycerol
2-oxoglutarate
2d Operations Group
Oxoglutarate dehydrogenase complex